Młynów is a M2 metro line Warsaw Metro station in Wola district, by the intersection of Górczewska and Syreny streets.

It is part of the extension of Line M2 from Rondo Daszyńskiego to Wola, with construction started in 2016. All three stations opened on April 4, 2020.

The station is 168.2 m in length, and the cubic capacity at 56 636 m³. The blue colour scheme of the station refers to the nearby swimming pool in Moczydło estate.

Description

The station is located 300 m west of the Institute of Tuberculosis and Lung Diseases (Polish: Instytut Gruźlicy i Chorób Płuc) of the Ministry of Health, and 300 m east of the Park Moczydło and Park Edwarda Szymańskiego.

The contractor for the station was Gülermak, which won the tender completed on 29 October 2015. The construction works began on 26 November 2016. Along with Księcia Janusza and Płocka, the station is part of the extension of the M2 metro line from Rondo Daszyńskiego to Wola. All three stations opened on April 4, 2020.

Gallery

External links
Detailed map of  Line M2 from official Warsaw Metro site

References 

Railway stations in Poland opened in 2020
Line 2 (Warsaw Metro) stations
Wola